In mathematics and theoretical physics, braid statistics is a generalization of the spin statistics of bosons and fermions based on the concept of braid group. While for fermions (Bosons) the corresponding statistics is associated to a phase gain of  under the exchange of identical particles, a particle with braid statistics leads to a rational fraction of  under such exchange  or even a non-trivial unitary transformation in the Hilbert space (see non-Abelian anyons). A similar notion exists using a loop braid group.

Braid statistics are applicable to theoretical particles such as the two-dimensional anyons and their higher-dimensional analogues known as plektons.

See also
 Braid symmetry
 Parastatistics
 Anyon

References

Parastatistics